The 2008 World Junior Ice Hockey Championship Division II was two international ice hockey tournaments, the third level of the 2008 World Junior Ice Hockey Championships.

Group A
The Group A tournament was played from 9 to 15 December 2007 in Canazei, Italy.

Final standings

Results
All times are local.

Group B
The Group B tournament was played from 10 to 16 December 2007 in Tallinn, Estonia.

Final standings

Results

See also
 2008 World Junior Ice Hockey Championships
 2008 World Junior Ice Hockey Championships – Division I
 2008 World Junior Ice Hockey Championships – Division II
 2008 World Junior Ice Hockey Championships – Division III
 2008 World Junior Ice Hockey Championships rosters

References

Junior World Championships - Division II
II
World Junior Ice Hockey Championships – Division II
International ice hockey competitions hosted by Italy
International ice hockey competitions hosted by Estonia
2007 in Italian sport
World